İzmir Democracy University is a public university in İzmir, Turkey. It was established by the Grand National Assembly of Turkey on 20 August 2016 with other 3 new universities.

İzmir Democracy University was cited by the press as the successor of İzmir University, which was closed private university by Turkish government on 23 July 2016. But the Council of Higher Education denied it and explained that İzmir Democracy University was not founded in place of İzmir University.

Organization
İzmir Democracy University has 10 faculties, 3 institutes and 3 other schools.

Faculties
Faculty of Education
Faculty of Law
Faculty of Science and Literature
Faculty of Administrative and Economic Sciences
Faculty of Fine Arts
Faculty of Engineering
Faculty of Architecture
Faculty of Medical Sciences
Faculty of Medicine
Faculty of Dentistry

Institutes
Institute of Graduate Studies in Science and Engineering
Institute of Social Sciences
Institute of Medical Sciences

Other schools
School of Foreign Languages
Vocational School of Health Services
Vocational School

References

Universities and colleges in İzmir
State universities and colleges in Turkey
Educational institutions established in 2016
2016 establishments in Turkey